Witcher Holes Creek is a stream in the U.S. state of South Dakota.

Witcher Holes Creek derives its name from Harry Witcher, an early settler, the creek forming pools of water or "holes" when it runs dry.

See also
List of rivers of South Dakota

References

Rivers of Haakon County, South Dakota
Rivers of South Dakota